Don't Wanna Hear About Your Band! is Swedish punk band Tiger Bell's first album. It was released on October 7, 2013.

Track listing

 Boy, There You Go
 Baby, You’re A Murderer
 Get Ready To Go
 Don’t Wanna Be 3
 You Gotta Let Me Know
 Valley Heights
 Look Into My Eyes
 Fragments
 If You Want Something, Go And Get It
 You’re Going Down
 Johnnie
 Don’t Wanna Hear About Your Band (featuring Danko Jones)

References

External links
 Official Website

2013 debut albums